Indoleamine-pyrrole 2,3-dioxygenase (IDO or INDO ) is a heme-containing enzyme physiologically expressed in a number of tissues and cells, such as the small intestine, lungs, female genital tract or placenta. In humans is encoded by the IDO1 gene. IDO is involved in tryptophan metabolism. It is one of three enzymes that catalyze the first and rate-limiting step in the kynurenine pathway, the O2-dependent oxidation of L-tryptophan to N-formylkynurenine, the others being indolamine-2,3-dioxygenase 2 (IDO2) and tryptophan 2,3-dioxygenase (TDO). IDO is an important part of the immune system and plays a part in natural defense against various pathogens. It is produced by the cells in response to inflammation and has an immunosuppressive function because of its ability to limit T-cell function and engage mechanisms of immune tolerance. Emerging evidence suggests that IDO becomes activated during tumor development, helping malignant cells escape eradication by the immune system. Expression of IDO has been described in a number of types of cancer, such as acute myeloid leukemia, ovarian cancer or colorectal cancer. IDO is part of the malignant transformation process and plays a key role in suppressing the anti-tumor immune response in the body, so inhibiting it could increase the effect of chemotherapy as well as other immunotherapeutic protocols.

Physiological function 

Indoleamine 2,3-dioxygenase is the first and rate-limiting enzyme of tryptophan catabolism through the kynurenine pathway.

IDO is an important molecule in the mechanisms of tolerance and its physiological functions include the suppression of potentially dangerous inflammatory processes in the body. IDO also plays a role in natural defense against microorganisms. Expression of IDO is induced by interferon-gamma, which explains why the expression increases during inflammatory diseases or even during tumorigenesis. Since tryptophan is essential for the survival of pathogens, the activity of enzyme IDO destroys them. Microorganisms susceptible to tryptophan deficiency include bacteria of genus Streptococcus or viruses such as herpes simplex or measles.

One of the organs with high IDO expression is the placenta. In the 1990s, the immunosuppressive function of this enzyme was first described in mice due to the study of placental tryptophan metabolism. Thus, mammalian placenta, due to intensive tryptophan catabolism has the ability to suppress T cell activity, thereby contributing to its position of immunologically privileged tissue.

Clinical significance 
IDO is an immune checkpoint molecule in the sense that it is an immunomodulatory enzyme produced by alternatively activated macrophages and other immunoregulatory cells. IDO is known to suppress T and NK cells, generate Tregs and myeloid-derived suppressor cells, and also supports angiogenesis.

These mechanisms are crucial in the process of carcinogenesis. IDO allows tumor cells to escape the immune system by two main mechanisms. The first mechanism is based on tryptophan depletion from the tumor microenvironment. The second mechanism is based on the production of catabolic products called kynurenins, that are cytotoxic for T lymphocytes and NK cells. Overexpression of human IDO (hIDO) is described in a variety of human tumor cell lineages and is often associated with poor prognosis. Tumors with increased production of IDO include prostate, ovarian, lung or pancreatic cancer or acute myeloid leukemia. Expression of IDO is under physiological conditions regulated by the Bin1 gene, which can be damaged by tumor transformation.

Emerging clinical studies suggest that combination of IDO inhibitors with classical chemotherapy and radiotherapy could restore immune control and provide a therapeutic response to generally resistant tumors. Enzyme IDO used by tumors to escape immune surveillance is currently in focus of research and drug discovery efforts, as well as efforts to understand if it could be used as a biomarker for prognosis.

Inhibitors 
COX-2 inhibitors down-regulate indoleamine 2,3-dioxygenase, leading to a reduction in kynurenine levels as well as reducing proinflammatory cytokine activity.

1-Methyltryptophan is a racemic compound that weakly inhibits indoleamine dioxygenase, but is also a very slow substrate. The specific racemer 1-methyl--tryptophan (known as indoximod) is in clinical trials for various cancers.

Epacadostat (INCB24360) and navoximod (GDC-0919) are potent inhibitors of the indoleamine 2,3-dioxygenase enzyme and are in clinical trials for various cancers. BMS-986205 is also in clinical trials for cancer.

See also 
 1-Methyltryptophan 
 Tryptophan 2,3-dioxygenase

References

External links 
 
 PDBe-KB provides an overview of all the structure information available in the PDB for Human Indoleamine 2,3-dioxygenase 1

EC 1.13.11
Immune system